The Writing's on the Wall is the second studio album by American girl group Destiny's Child. It was released on July 14, 1999, by Columbia Records.

Seeking transition from the neo soul sound of their eponymous studio album (1998), Destiny's Child enlisted an almost entirely different array of songwriters and producers for The Writing's on the Wall, including Kevin "She'kspere" Briggs, Kandi Burruss, Missy Elliott, Rodney Jerkins and LaShawn Daniels, among others. Their final product was an R&B, pop, hip hop and soul record incorporating unconventional sonic elements alongside complex arrangements and layered staccato rap-singing vocals. Lyrically, the album is constructed as a concept album, with each of its tracks representing a Ten Commandments-inspired "Commandment of Relationships". Its themes include infatuation, dependency, infidelity and separation, while a loose religious theme is maintained throughout the album.

Upon its release, The Writing's on the Wall received critical acclaim, which would further solidify in retrospective reviews, with most of the praise directed towards its production and innovative approach. A commercial success, it debuted at number six on the US Billboard 200 with first-week sales of 133,000 units. Due to vigorous promotional activities and success of its singles, the album's sales continuously kept increasing within the year following its release. Consequently, it peaked at number five on the Billboard 200 in May 2000, and has gone on to be certified octuple platinum by the Recording Industry Association of America (RIAA). With worldwide sales of 13 million copies, the album is one of the best-selling girl group albums and best-selling R&B albums of all time.

The Writing's on the Wall produced four singles. "Bills, Bills, Bills" became Destiny's Child's first US Billboard Hot 100 number-one single and attained the top ten in several other countries; it was also nominated for two Grammy Awards. "Bug a Boo" failed to replicate the success of its predecessor, peaking only at number 33 on the Billboard Hot 100 and faring moderately overseas. "Say My Name" became the group's second Billboard Hot 100 number-one single and a widespread international success. Critically acclaimed, it won them their first two Grammy Awards, with its accompanying music video winning their first MTV Video Music Award. "Jumpin', Jumpin'" became the group's first US Mainstream Top 40 number-one single, while peaking at number three on the Billboard Hot 100.

Considered Destiny's Child's breakthrough album by music critics, The Writing's on the Wall was often overshadowed by the controversy surrounding its promotional era as a result of the group's internal conflicts. The accompanying music video for "Say My Name" saw original members LeToya Luckett and LaTavia Roberson–who had attempted to split with their manager Mathew Knowles–unexpectedly replaced with Farrah Franklin and Michelle Williams. Luckett and Roberson filed a lawsuit against Knowles and former bandmates, and Franklin departed from the group mere five months after joining, leaving it as a trio. Regardless of the turmoil, various publications have listed the album among the best records of its time and genre, noting its immense influence on numerous artists decades after its release.

Background and development
In 1995, Destiny was signed to Elektra Records by Sylvia Rhone. However, they were dismissed from the label eight months into their contract, without having even released an album, for being "too young and undeveloped". Changing their name to Destiny's Child, the group was signed to Columbia Records by Teresa LaBarbera Whites in 1996, after negotiations from Beyoncé's father Mathew Knowles, who became the group's manager. Destiny's Child made their recording debut with the inclusion of the track "Killing Time" on the Men in Black soundtrack in July 1997. Three months later, their debut single "No, No, No" was released, eventually going on to peak at number three on the US Billboard Hot 100 and atop the Hot R&B/Hip-Hop Songs. The neo soul and R&B-infused eponymous debut studio album followed in February 1998, to a mixed critical reception.

Commercially, Destiny's Child was a slow seller, peaking only at number 67 on the US Billboard 200, but managed to earn a platinum certification from the Recording Industry Association of America (RIAA) two years after its release. It produced one more single, "With Me", which failed to replicate the success of its predecessor. Beyoncé would retrospectively label their debut album "successful but not hugely successful" as it was "a neo-soul record and we were 15 years old. It was way too mature for us." In September, the group's contribution to the Why Do Fools Fall in Love soundtrack, "Get on the Bus"–a collaboration with Timbaland–was released to moderate commercial success. Around this time, Destiny's Child–partly dissatisfied with their debut–began conceiving ideas for its follow-up. As they were preparing to write and record new material, they sat together and listed what they liked and disliked about the debut in order to improve.

Recording and production

The production for The Writing's on the Wall commenced in October 1998. Beyoncé later claimed the group wasn't nervous about a sophomore slump and had many ideas for the album, as they weren't entirely satisfied with their debut. Compared to its predecessor, the album saw group members take more creative control; Beyoncé co-wrote 11 out of 16 tracks, Kelly Rowland co-wrote ten, LeToya Luckett nine and LaTavia Roberson eight. They would rewrite lyrics they received to adjust them into songs suitable for them. Beyoncé sought inspiration for her songwriting from the customers at her mother Tina Knowles' hair salon, namely their grievances and complaints over men, relationships and financial hardships. She additionally produced four tracks from the album, while participating in vocal production and arrangement on several tracks as well.

The group's artists and repertoire (A&R) executive Teresa LaBarbera Whites suggested the group to consult producer Kevin "She'kspere" Briggs. Upon arriving to Houston, where majority of The Writing's on the Wall was recorded, Briggs and his then-girlfriend, singer-songwriter Kandi Burruss, were told there was space for only one more track on the album. However, after the pair presented "Bug a Boo", the group decided to structure the entire record around it. Briggs ended up producing four additional songs–"So Good", "Bills, Bills, Bills", "Hey Ladies" and "She Can't Love You"–co-writing them with Burruss. Burruss would reveal in 2011 that at the time of the album's production, one of the group members was dating her former boyfriend on whom "Bills, Bills, Bills" was based. Being promoted to executive producer alongside the group's manager Mathew Knowles, Briggs introduced skittering quadruple-time beats while encouraging stuttering vocal phrasing, both of which defined the album's sound.

Rodney Jerkins produced "Say My Name", which was recorded at the Pacifique Recording Studios in North Hollywood, Los Angeles. He co-wrote it with his brother Fred Jerkins III, LaShawn Daniels and the group members. Daniels, who helmed its vocal production, based the song on a relationship he had experienced. He said it was "actually the premise of what I would go through, and we had the conversation of 'how embarrassing is that?' Beyoncé was in a relationship at that time, and she could relate well to the situation." However, the group rejected the song's original mix, and the track was almost left unused. Beyoncé later described the original mix as having "too much stuff going on in it. It just sounded like this ... jungle." Jerkins then introduced a new mix of the song to Mathew Knowles, and the track was subsequently included on the album. According to Daniels, Destiny's Child equally contributed to the track, stating: "As time went forward, their creative input was undeniable. If you came up with a melody or something, and it just didn't sit well with them, or if they didn't think it was dope, their creativity would absolutely speak back. We always had a respect of each other's creativity. There were no egos to stop any idea from making it out of any of our mouths."

Missy Elliott wrote and produced "Confessions", on which she made a guest appearance; the track was recorded at The Hit Factory in New York City and The Enterprise in Los Angeles. D'wayne Wiggins produced and co-wrote "Temptations" and "Sweet Sixteen", which were recorded at the Digital Sound in Houston and the House of Music in Oakland, California. "Stay" was solely written and produced by Daryl Simmons, being recorded at the Silent Sound Studios in Atlanta. Next were featured on "If You Leave", which was written by their member R.L. Huggar; it was co-written and produced by Chad Elliot, who also co-wrote and produced "Jumpin, Jumpin". The former was recorded at the Electric Lady Studios in New York City and the Dallas Sound Lab, while the latter was recorded at the 353 Studio in New York City and the 24/7 Studio in Atlanta. Meanwhile, Ken Fambro and Donnie Boynton co-wrote and produced "Now That She's Gone". By April 1999, The Writing's on the Wall had been completed.

Music and lyrics

The Writing's on the Wall is predominantly an R&B, pop, hip hop and soul record. Its instrumentations notably incorporate sounds such as record scratches, bubbles and breaking glass, as well as guitar riffs "chiseled to a point like stiletto heels", complex percussion arrangements, and orchestral brass "draped in the background like plush curtains", while the vocals are "wound in and around like scrollwork". Constructed as a concept album, each of its tracks represents a Ten Commandments-inspired "Commandment of Relationships", which is stated at the end of each track in reference to the following one. Lyrically, the album has been described as having a "cynical, jaded, sometimes-transactional view of love". It opens with its title-track intro inspired by The Godfather scene in the 1996 film Set It Off, which sees Rowland, Luckett and Roberson gathering to meet their "godfather" Beyoncé and to discuss their "Commandments of Relationships". As the members mention betrayal from different men, the tone for the album is immediately set as "a tale of empowerment and vengeance". The first commandment "Thou shalt not hate" announces "So Good", which sees the protagonist flaunting her success to a hateful and jealous former lover. Its instrumentation consists of sped-up acoustic guitar loops. The "sassy", "playful" and "jittery" R&B track "Bills, Bills, Bills" features "slinky" instrumentation led by harpsichord-synthesizers. Lyrically, the song confronts a boyfriend for his lack of accountability over credit card and phone bill charges while following the "Thou shalt pay bills" commandment. Numerous critics drew parallels between the track and TLC's "No Scrubs", also written by Kevin "She'kspere" Briggs and Kandi Burruss around the same time. Burruss claimed it was written based on her own personal experience with a former boyfriend. On the 1970s-influenced soul track "Confessions", featuring a spoken-word performance by Missy Elliott, Beyoncé admits to infidelity as "Thou shalt confess". "Bug a Boo" speaks against an overly-attached boyfriend and follows the "Thou shalt not bug" commandment. The "coy, pillowy" sixth track "Temptation" discusses abstinence from having sex with a virtual stranger while already being involved in a relationship, as "Thou shalt not give in to temptation".

"Now That She's Gone" showcases a female protagonist's refusal to rekindle the relationship with a former boyfriend who has returned after being abandoned by another woman, due to the "Thou shalt not think you got it like that" commandment. "Thou shalt not leave me wondering" is the theme of "Where'd You Go", which sees a protagonist pleading her partner to stay after noticing his loss of interest towards her. The upbeat "Hey Ladies" encourages women to take a stand against their deceitful boyfriends as "Thou shalt know when he's got to go". The "late night, slow-jam" tenth track "If You Leave" is a collaboration with Next, who are referenced in its commandment "Thou shalt move on to the next". Lyrically, the song centers around a couple debating over whether they should leave their respective partners and begin a relationship together. The uptempo dance-pop track "Jumpin, Jumpin" encourages women to "leave [their] men at home" in favor of going to a nightclub filled with rich men, under the commandment "Thou shalt get your party on". The commandment "Thou shalt say my name" precedes "Say My Name", singled out by multiple publications as the album's highlight. The track reprises the "thick, paranoid mix" of Rodney Jerkins' prior production "The Boy Is Mine", the 1998 duet between Brandy and Monica. It "hopscotches" through different sonic elements, shifting from a "slow, sexy" bass to syncopated, synth-infused strings and record scratches. Lyrically, the song features a female protagonist suspecting her boyfriend of cheating. Acoustic guitar-driven Latin and bolero ballad "She Can't Love You" is lyrically characterized by the commandment "Thou shalt know she can't love you", as Beyoncé sings "She can't love you like I can / All of her love just can't compare to what I have". The ballad "Stay" is preceded by "If thou can wait, then thou shalt stay", and discusses a relationship which is deteriorating due to the female protagonist not wanting to consummate it, much to her boyfriend's dissatisfaction. "Thou shalt cherish life" is the message of "Sweet Sixteen", which follows a girl named Jackie who is eager to grow up. The Writing's on the Wall closes with an a cappella cover of "Amazing Grace", which acts as the outro and is dedicated to the late Andretta Tilman, the group's original manager.

Title and artwork
Speaking of the title for The Writing's on the Wall in a May 2000 interview for Jet, Kelly Rowland revealed: "When we were looking for a title, we had that name and another. We asked Wyclef which was tighter. He said, 'The Writing's On The Wall sounds really cool'. Then he went into a story about Moses finding the Ten Commandments on the wall. He said 'add that to Destiny's Child's commandments of relationships, which will mean something big is about to happen." Similarly, biographer Daryl Easlea noted the title was taken from the Book of Daniel from the Bible's Old Testament; in the book, supernatural writing foretold the demise of Babylonia.

Related to the title, all 14 "Commandments of Relationships" heard on The Writing's on the Wall are listed on the front of its CD. The cover artwork for the album was photographed by Hide Olda and depicts the members wearing white halter tops and facing directly into the camera. The light grey wall behind them features the group's name and the album's title written in a blurry manner, signifying "the writings on the wall". Jaelani Turner-Williams from Stereogum described the cover as "futuristic".

Release and promotion
In the United States, The Writing's on the Wall was released on July 27, 1999, by Columbia Records. Initially, it wasn't heavily promoted; the first televised performance in support of the album was that of "Bills, Bills, Bills" at the Soul Train Lady of Soul Awards on September 3. The group subsequently embarked on TLC's FanMail Tour as an opening act during its October–December North American leg. Promotion intensified following the release of "Say My Name" as the album's third single, with the group performing the song on The Tonight Show with Jay Leno on March 3, 2000, at the 2000 Soul Train Music Awards on March 4, with "Bug a Boo" during MTV Spring Break  on March 16, on the April 7 episode of Top of the Pops in the United Kingdom, at the TMF Awards in the Netherlands on April 15, and as an opening act for Britney Spears' free (You Drive Me) Crazy Tour concert in Honolulu, Hawaii on April 24. They continued promoting the album by performing its fourth and final single "Jumpin', Jumpin'" on The Tonight Show with Jay Leno on June 8, and on the July 28 episode of Top of the Pops.

On July 9, Destiny's Child performed "So Good", "Say My Name" and "Bills, Bills, Bills" during Party in the Park in London. That month, they joined Christina Aguilera as opening acts on her tour Christina Aguilera in Concert, touring North America until October. While on tour, the group performed a 45-minute set at The Big E on September 17, as well as performing "Say My Name" at the MuchMusic Video Awards on September 21. In Europe, The Writing's on the Wall was re-released to include a bonus disc with then-new single "Independent Women Part I" in November. At the Billboard Music Awards on December 5, the group performed a medley composed of "Independent Women Part I", "Say My Name" and "Jumpin', Jumpin'". They performed nominated songs "Independent Women Part I" and "Say My Name" at the 43rd Annual Grammy Awards on February 21, 2001, when they won their first two Grammy Awards, both for "Say My Name". In honor of the album's 20th anniversary in July 2019, Sony Music launched "Destiny's Child 2019 Dating Commandments". Similar to Tinder, the interactive dating app modernized the 14 "Commandments of Relationships" from the album. In addition, the album was made available on a limited-edition clear vinyl with black splatter exclusively at Urban Outfitters on November 1.

Singles
"Bills, Bills, Bills" was released as the lead single from The Writing's on the Wall on May 31, 1999. A commercial success, it became Destiny's Child's first US Billboard Hot 100 number-one single, also topping the US Hot R&B/Hip-Hop Songs for nine consecutive weeks. The digital single was certified platinum by the Recording Industry Association of America (RIAA) on July 2, 2020. Internationally, the song reached the top ten in Belgium, Canada, Iceland, the Netherlands and the United Kingdom. Critically acclaimed, it was nominated for Best R&B Performance by a Duo or Group with Vocals and Best R&B Song at the 42nd Annual Grammy Awards (2000). Its accompanying music video was directed by Darren Grant and was a tribute to Tina Knowles, Beyoncé's mother and the group's then-stylist, as it depicts group members as hair salon employees frustrated with men.

"Bug a Boo" was released as the second single from The Writing's on the Wall on July 7, 1999. It failed to replicate the commercial success of its predecessor, as it peaked only at number 33 on the US Billboard Hot 100 and number 15 on the US Hot R&B/Hip-Hop Songs. The song fared better internationally, peaking within the top ten in the Netherlands and the UK. Its Grant-directed accompanying music video shows the group members fleeing from aggravating boyfriends, and features cameo appearances from Kobe Bryant and Wyclef Jean.

"Say My Name" was released as the third single from The Writing's on the Wall on October 14, 1999. It became Destiny's Child's second US Billboard Hot 100 and third US Hot R&B/Hip-Hop Songs number-one single. The digital single was certified triple platinum by the RIAA on July 2, 2020. Internationally, the song reached the summit in Australia and the top ten in Belgium, Canada, France, Iceland, the Netherlands, New Zealand, Norway, Poland and the UK. Critically acclaimed, it won the group's first two Grammy Awards–for Best R&B Performance by a Duo or Group with Vocals and Best R&B Song–while also being nominated for Record of the Year and Song of the Year, at the 43rd annual ceremony (2001). Its Joseph Kahn-directed accompanying music video was a subject of controversy, as it saw LeToya Luckett and LaTavia Roberson be replaced–without their knowledge or consent–with Farrah Franklin and Michelle Williams. The video won the group their first MTV Video Music Award, for Best R&B Video in 2000.

"Jumpin', Jumpin'" was released as the fourth and final single from The Writing's on the Wall on July 4, 2000, to critical acclaim. A commercial success, it peaked at number three on the US Billboard Hot 100 and became the group's first US Mainstream Top 40 number-one single. The digital single was certified platinum by the RIAA on July 2, 2020. Internationally, the song attained the top ten in Australia, Canada, Iceland, the Netherlands, New Zealand and the UK. Its accompanying music video was the group's second consecutive to be directed by Kahn, and shows the members going out to a nightclub.

"So Good" was serviced to rhythmic contemporary radio in the United States on January 16, 2001. However, its single treatment was halted due to the success of "Independent Women Part I" and Destiny's Child heading forward into the promotional cycle for their subsequent studio album Survivor.

Critical reception

Upon its release, The Writing's on the Wall received generally favorable reviews from music critics. Stephen Thomas Erlewine from AllMusic wrote that with the album "Destiny's Child still suffers from slightly uneven songwriting, but it's nevertheless an assured step forward for the girl group", adding that "even when the album fails to deliver memorable songs, it always sounds alluring, thanks to the perfect combination of vocalists and producers". Rob Brunner from Entertainment Weekly praised the group for being able to "prove themselves to be more capable of confident, inventive R&B than many of their contemporaries" with the album but dismissed the "banal balladry" of "Stay" and "Sweet Sixteen". Writing for The Village Voice, Robert Christgau commended the group for sounding mature but criticized the album's lyrical content. Rob Sheffield from Rolling Stone was, however, more negative towards the album, writing: "Despite OK moments like the "Waterfalls" sequel "Sweet Sixteen," the Destiny children never find that one money tune that turns a no-no-no scrub into a yeah-yeah-yeah paying customer. In a review for NME, Dele Fadele praised the contemporary sound of the album, citing "Confessions" and "If You Leave" as its highlights.

Retrospectively, The Writing's on the Wall has continued receiving critical acclaim. In The New Rolling Stone Album Guide (2004), Nathan Brackett and Christian Hoard referenced Sheffield's 1999 review for Rolling Stone by saying the album's singles "Say My Name" and "Jumpin', Jumpin'" were, indeed, "catchy enough to turn any no-no-no scrub into yeah-yeah-yeah paying customer". In The Encyclopedia of Popular Music (2007), Colin Larkin gave the album a four-star review. Katherine St. Asaph from Pitchfork praised the album for its impact and influence on R&B artists, writing: "Beyond its tabloid drama, the innovation of Destiny's Child's second album codified the sound of R&B at the turn of the millennium." Wren Graves from Consequence praised the album for having "remarkably good" non-single tracks, but dismissed "Temptation" and "If You Leave" as its "dull spots". Taryn Finley of HuffPost praised the album for helping "usher in a new wave of R&B", labeling it "the quintessential 1999 album".

Accolades

Awards and nominations

|-
! scope="row"| 2000
| Soul Train Music Award
| Best R&B/Soul Album – Group, Band or Duo
| rowspan="3"| The Writing's on the Wall
| 
| 
|-
! scope="row"| 2000
| Soul Train Lady of Soul Award
| Best R&B/Soul Album
| 
| 
|-
! scope="row"| 2001
| American Music Award
| Favorite Soul/R&B Album
| 
| 
|}

Listings

Commercial performance
In the United States, The Writing's on the Wall debuted at number six on the Billboard 200 chart dated August 14, 1999, with first-week sales of 133,000 copies. On the Top R&B/Hip-Hop Albums, it debuted and peaked at number two the same week. The album was the 42nd best-selling album of 1999, selling 1.6 million copies by the end of the year. The heavy rotation of its third single "Say My Name" and increased promotional activities reinvigorated the album's sales. Seven weeks after "Say My Name" reached the summit of the Billboard Hot 100, the album registered a new single-week sales high with 157,000 units. It subsequently went on to ascend towards a new peak on the Billboard 200 at number five on May 6, 2000. During the Christmas week of 2000, the album achieved its highest single-week sales with 163,000 units, while remaining stable within the top 40 in its 74th week of charting. On the year-end Billboard 200 for 2000, it placed at number 13, and was the tenth best-selling album of the year with sales of 3.8 million copies. In total, it spent 99 consecutive weeks on the Billboard 200, exiting from the chart in July 2001. On November 6, the album was certified octuple platinum by the Recording Industry Association of America (RIAA). As of 2015, the album has sold over seven million units in the country, being the second best-selling girl group album ever in the US.

Internationally, The Writing's on the Wall was a sleeper hit. In Canada, it debuted at number 13 on the Canadian Albums Chart dated August 14, 1999, peaking at number five after a year of charting on August 26, 2000. It was certified quintuple platinum by the Canadian Recording Industry Association (CRIA) on February 28, 2001. In Australia, it debuted at number nine on the ARIA Top 100 Albums and peaked at number two in its third week. The album was certified triple platinum by the Australian Recording Industry Association (ARIA) in February 2001. In New Zealand, the album debuted at number 30 before departing from the chart in its second week. It re-entered the chart in its third week and went on to peak at number six in its tenth week. Recording Industry Association of New Zealand certified it triple platinum in November 2000. In the United Kingdom, the album debuted at number 12 on the UK Albums Chart and atop the UK R&B Albums Chart. It was certified platinum by the British Phonographic Industry (BPI) in August 2000 and, after 70 weeks of fluctuations, peaked at number ten on the UK Albums Chart on January 6, 2001. In Europe, the album peaked at number 23 on the European Top 100 Albums after being reissued, and was certified double platinum by the International Federation of the Phonographic Industry (IFPI). In addition, it eventually ascended to the top ten in Belgium, Ireland, the Netherlands, Norway and Portugal after debuting at lower positions. With worldwide sales of 13 million copies, The Writing's on the Wall is the fourth best-selling girl group album of all time, also being one of the best-selling R&B albums of all time.

Controversy

The promotional era of The Writing's on the Wall was infused with controversy and conflicts within Destiny's Child's members and management. In December 1999, LeToya Luckett and LaTavia Roberson attempted to split with their manager Mathew Knowles, claiming that he kept a disproportionate share of the group's profits and unfairly favored his daughter Beyoncé Knowles and Kelly Rowland. While they never intended to leave the group, they found out that two new members were joining Beyoncé and Rowland once the accompanying music video for "Say My Name" premiered on February 15, 2000. Prior to its premiere, Beyoncé announced on Total Request Live that Luckett and Roberson had left the group. They were replaced by Michelle Williams, a former backup singer to Monica, and Farrah Franklin, an aspiring singer-actress. Shortly after her stint with Monica, Williams was introduced to Destiny's Child by choreographer Braden "Peanut Orlando" Larson, and was flown to Houston, where she stayed with the Knowles family.

On March 15, Roberson and Luckett filed a lawsuit against Mathew Knowles and their former bandmates for breach of partnership and fiduciary duties. Following the lawsuit, both sides were disparaging towards each other in the media. Five months after joining, Franklin left Destiny's Child. The remaining members claimed that this was due to missed promotional appearances and concerts. According to Williams, Franklin could not handle stress. Franklin, however, disclosed that she left because of the negativity surrounding the strife and her inability to assert any control in the decision-making. Her departure was seen as less controversial. Williams, on the other hand, disclosed that her inclusion in the group resulted in her "battling insecurity" by saying: "I was comparing myself to the other members, and the pressure was on me." Towards the end of 2000, Roberson and Luckett dropped the portion of their lawsuit aimed at Beyoncé and Rowland in exchange for a settlement, though they continued the action against Mathew Knowles. As part of the agreement, both sides were prohibited from speaking about each other publicly. Roberson and Luckett formed another girl group named Anjel but also left it due to issues with their record company 581 Entertainment.

Impact and legacy
The Writing's on the Wall has been declared Destiny's Child's breakthrough album by numerous music critics, as it spurred their career and introduced them to a wider audience. Chris Malone from Billboard stated the album "almost instantly cemented Destiny's Child as one of the most iconic girl groups of all time". Despite initial skepticism towards the album, various critics would acknowledge its immense impact on R&B and pop music in retrospective commentary, crediting it for having defined the sound of mainstream music at the turn of the millennium. Music industry writer Naima Cochrane called it one of the most important recordings of the transitional phase between the 1990s and 2000s, adding that it "set the tone for what mainstream R&B was gonna sound like for the next several years and the R&B sound that was neo-soul started moving into the adult urban lane. The Writing's on the Wall is like that fork in the road between what started as mainstream R&B and what ended up becoming adult contemporary R&B." Its feminist lyrical undertones have also received recognition. Meena Alexander from Stylist remarked: "Despite being only 17 when the album was released, Destiny's Child had already cultivated a feminist message that stood out amid the saccharine girl-pop and heartbroken ballads of their contemporaries."

Within the period of its commercial peak, The Writing's on the Wall was at the center of controversy, following the highly publicized departure of LeToya Luckett and LaTavia Roberson, original members of Destiny's Child, in February 2000 and the ensuing lawsuit they filed against the group and their manager Mathew Knowles. Regardless, the album "emerged unscathed, bursting with bangers and destined to become one of the best-selling R&B albums of all time". Although members were affected by the turmoil, the group's success continued, with the years following the controversy seen as the most substantial stretch of their career, and them becoming a pop culture phenomenon. Their third studio album Survivor (2001) and its title track are considered responses to the media for the scrutiny the group was placed under throughout the promotional era of The Writing's on the Wall. Multiple critics have also noted the album for being the platform upon which Beyoncé would launch her solo career. Tom Breihan from Stereogum shared those sentiments, adding: "Beyoncé, who dominated every track on The Writing’s On The Wall, was young enough to take immediately to the new sounds that were suddenly reshaping R&B aesthetics. And she'd practiced hard enough that she had the technical skills to handle tracks like that while still broadcasting personality all over them." He additionally noted that the album would pave the way for her sixth solo studio album Lemonade (2016), saying: "When a full-grown Beyoncé went back into accusatory mode years later on Lemonade, she had the weight of cultural memory working for her. We'd already known since she was a kid that she wasn't taking any bullshit."

The Writing's on the Wall has also been noted for its tremendous influence on artists in terms of lyrical themes, vocal performances and visuals. The album introduced staccato rap-singing, most notably on its tracks "Bug a Boo" and "Say My Name". In a 2006 interview for The Guardian upon the release of her second solo studio album B'Day, Beyoncé claimed: "That staccato, fast singing has kind of become the sound of R&B. It’s still here in 2006. But we had no idea of what its impact would be. We had no idea that The Writing's on the Wall would be as big a record as it was. Especially worldwide." Canadian rapper Drake was cited as one of the artists who sought vocal inspiration from the album, most notably on his 2013 track "Girls Love Beyoncé", on which James Fauntleroy sang the chorus of "Say My Name". In a 2019 interview with Vice, Kandi Burruss–one of the key contributors on the album–said its feminist undertone-based influence was evident even two decades following its release, citing women's empowerment-themed efforts by artists such as Rihanna, Lizzo and Megan Thee Stallion. The music videos for Kehlani's 2016 song "Distraction" and Tove Styrke's 2017 song "Say My Name" have also been described as homages to the music video for "Say My Name", further expanding the album's influence.

Track listing

Notes
 signifies a producer and vocal producer
 signifies a vocal producer
 signifies a co-producer
 signifies an additional vocal producer
 signifies the lyrics being credited to "public domain"
Tracks 1–15 end with brief interludes spoken by the group members, each of which relates to the following track. Each interlude represents a Ten Commandments-inspired "Commandment of Relationships".

Sample credits
 "Temptation" contains resung elements from "Whatever You Want" by Tony! Toni! Toné! and "Posse on Broadway" by Sir Mix-a-Lot.
 "Sweet Sixteen" contains an uncredited sample from "Theme from Mahogany (Do You Know Where You're Going To)" by Diana Ross.

Personnel
Credits are adapted from the liner notes of The Writing's on the Wall.

 Charles Alexander – mixing (track 11)
 Jovonn Alexander – production (track 11)
 Steve Baughman – mixing assistance (track 3)
 Chris Bell – engineering (track 10)
 Donnie "D-Major" Boynton – production (track 7), songwriting (track 7)
 Kevin "She'kspere" Briggs – engineering (tracks 2, 3, 5, 9 and 13), executive production, instrumentation (tracks 2, 3, 5, 9 and 13), Midi & Sound (tracks 2, 3, 5 and 13), production (tracks 2, 3, 5, 9 and 13), songwriting (tracks 2, 3, 5, 9 and 13), vocal production (tracks 2, 3, 5, 9 and 13)
 Joe Bruer – engineering (track 8)
 Kandi Burruss – songwriting (tracks 2, 3, 5, 9 and 13), vocal production (tracks 2, 5, 9 and 13)
 Michael Calderon – engineering (tracks 1, 3 and 6)
 LaShawn Daniels – engineering (track 12), songwriting (track 12), vocal production (track 12)
 Kevin "KD" Davis – mixing (tracks 2, 3, 5, 9 and 13)
 Andre DeBaurg – engineering (tracks 10 and 11)
 David Donaldson – engineering (track 11)
 Jimmy Douglass – engineering (track 4)
 Blake Eiseman – engineering (track 7)
 Chad "Dr. Cuess" Elliot – mixing (track 11), production (tracks 10 and 11), songwriting (tracks 10 and 11)
 Missy Elliott – production (track 4), songwriting (track 4), vocals (track 4)
 Ken "K-Fam" Fambro – production (track 7), songwriting (track 7)
 Ronnie Garrett – bass (track 14)
 Jon Gass – mixing (track 14)
 Tara Geter – songwriting (track 7)
 Brad Gildem – engineering (track 12)
 Anthony Hardy – instrumentation (track 1), production (track 1)
 Donald "Lenny" Holmes – instrumentation (track 1), production (tracks 1 and 4), songwriting (track 4)
 James Hoover – engineering (tracks 7, 15 and 16)
 Jean Marie Horout – mixing (track 12)
 R.L. Huggar – songwriting (track 10)
 Oshea Hunter – production (track 10), songwriting (track 10)
 Fred Jerkins III – songwriting (track 12)
 Rodney Jerkins – backing vocals (track 12), production (track 12), songwriting (track 12)
 Thom "TK" Kidd – engineering (track 14)
 Kiko – art direction, design
 Beyoncé Knowles – additional vocal production (track 9), arrangement (track 16), lead vocals (all tracks), production (tracks 1, 8, 15 and 16), songwriting (tracks 1–3, 5, 6, 8, 9, 11–13 and 15), vocal arrangement (tracks 6 and 16), vocal production (tracks 3 and 13), vocals (all tracks)
 Mathew Knowles – executive production, mixing (track 16)
 Mike Kopcha – mixing assistance (tracks 2, 5, 9 and 13)
 Sonny Lallerstedt – guitar (track 14)
 Vincent Lars – saxophone (track 15)
 Kevin Lively – engineering assistance (track 14)
 LeToya Luckett – lead vocals (track 1), songwriting (tracks 1–3, 5, 6, 8, 9, 12 and 13), vocals (all tracks)
 Steve McCauley – mixing assistance (tracks 4 and 15)
 Raymond McKinley – bass (track 15)
 Rufus Moore – songwriting (track 11)
 Ramon Morales – engineering (tracks 5, 9 and 13)
 Vernon Mungo – engineering (track 3)
 Next – vocals (track 10)
 Hide Olda – photography
 Bill Ortiz – trumpet (track 15)
 Lance Pierre – mixing assistance (track 8)
 Platinum Status – drum programming (track 8), keyboards (track 8), production (track 8), songwriting (track 8)
 Claudine Pontier – engineering assistance (track 3)
 Anthony Ray – songwriting (track 6)
 Ted Regier – mixing assistance (tracks 4, 6, 7 and 15)
 Byron Rittenhouse – backing vocals (track 11)
 LaTavia Roberson – lead vocals (tracks 1, 8 and 15), songwriting (tracks 1, 2, 5, 6, 8, 9, 12 and 13), vocals (all tracks)
 Kelly Rowland – lead vocals (tracks 1–3, 7, 10, 13 and 16), songwriting (tracks 1–3, 5, 6, 8, 9, 12, 13 and 15), vocals (all tracks)
 Albert Sanchez – photography
 Aleese Simmons – songwriting (track 7)
 Daryl Simmons – drum programming (track 14), keyboards (track 14), production (track 14), songwriting (track 14)
 Dexter Simmons – mixing (tracks 4, 6, 8, 10 and 15)
 Latrelle Simmons – songwriting (track 7), vocal arrangement (track 7)
 Ivy Skoff – production coordination (track 14)
 Charles Spikes – guitar (track 6)
 Brian Springer – engineering (track 4)
 Kenny Stallworth – engineering assistance (track 7)
 Chris Stokes – production (track 8), songwriting (track 8)
 Joey Swails – engineering (tracks 6 and 15)
 Terry-T – bass (track 6), drum machine (track 6), keyboards (track 6), production (track 6)
 Gerard Thomas – instrumentation (track 1), production (tracks 1 and 4), songwriting (track 4)
 Tyvette Turman – songwriting (track 10)
 Stephanie Vonarx – engineering assistance (track 14)
 Chuck Walpole – engineering (track 6)
 Jody Watley – songwriting (track 15)
 Carl Wheeler – songwriting (track 6)
 Teresa LaBarbera Whites – A&R
 D'wayne Wiggins – bass (track 6), drum machine (track 15), guitar (tracks 6 and 15), production (tracks 6 and 15), songwriting (tracks 6 and 15), synthesizer (track 15)
 Tony Williams – additional drum programming (track 14)
 Dan Workman – engineering (tracks 2 and 5)

Charts

Weekly charts

Year-end charts

Decade-end charts

All-time charts

Certifications

Release history

See also 
 Destiny's Child discography
 List of UK R&B Albums Chart number ones of 1999
 List of best-selling girl group albums
 Rolling Stones 500 Greatest Albums of All Time
 The Platinum's on the Wall

Notes

References

Bibliography

Further reading

External links 
 Official website
 

1999 albums
Albums produced by Rodney Jerkins
Albums produced by Missy Elliott
Columbia Records albums
Destiny's Child albums
Albums produced by Beyoncé